The Petersen Automotive Museum is located on Wilshire Boulevard along Museum Row in the Miracle Mile neighborhood of Los Angeles. One of the world's largest automotive museums, the Petersen Automotive Museum is a nonprofit organization specializing in automobile history and related educational programs. It was also the site of the drive-by shooting of rapper The Notorious B.I.G. on March 9, 1997.

History
Founded on June 11, 1994, by magazine publisher Robert E. Petersen and his wife Margie, the $40-million Petersen Automotive Museum is owned and operated by the Petersen Automotive Museum Foundation. The museum was originally located within the Natural History Museum of Los Angeles County, and later moved to a historic department store designed by Welton Becket.  Opened in 1962, the building first served as a short-lived U.S. branch of Seibu Department Stores, before operating as an Ohrbach's department store from 1965 to 1986.  Six years after Ohrbach's closed, Robert Petersen selected the largely windowless site as an ideal space for a museum—allowing artifacts to be displayed without harmful exposure to direct sunlight.

In 2015, the museum underwent an extensive $125 million renovation. The building's façade was redesigned by the architectural firm Kohn Pedersen Fox, and features a stainless-steel ribbon assembly made of 100 tons of 14-gauge type 304 steel in 308 sections, 25 supports and 140,000 custom stainless-steel screws. Designers at The Scenic Route configured interior spaces to accommodate changing exhibits. The remodeled museum opened to the public on December 7, 2015.

Exhibits and Collection

The museum has over 100 vehicles on display in its 25 galleries. The remaining half is kept in a vault on the building's basement level. Age restrictions and an admission premium are in effect to view the vault collection. The ground floor focuses on automotive artistry, showcasing an array of extravagant automobiles. The second floor is principally concerned with industrial engineering—including design, performance, and a collection of interactive teaching exhibits. Special displays on the industry floor cover racing, motorcycles, hot rods and customs. The third floor chronicles the history of the automobile, with an emphasis on the car culture of Southern California.

Exhibits
Some of the museums exhibits have included:
 An extensive Porsche exhibit (until January 2019), including  one of only two 1939 Porsche 64s in existence.
 An exhibit on the history of the Japanese automotive industry, with many cars on view from Japanese collections
 An exhibit on powered children's racecars

Collection
The museum's collection of vehicles includes:
 The "NASCAR Herbie" Volkswagen Beetle used during filming of Herbie: Fully Loaded
 Suki's hot pink Honda S2000 from 2 Fast 2 Furious.
 Lightning McQueen from Disney Pixar Cars and Cars 2
 A 1964 Chevrolet Impala lowrider owned by Jesse Valadez known as Gypsy Rose
 A 1967 Ford GT40 Mk III
 A 1956 Jaguar XKSS formerly owned by Steve McQueen
 A 2011 Ford Fiesta from Ken Block’s Gymkhana 3
 A 1992 Batmobile from Batman Returns
 A Ferrari 308 GTS used by Tom Selleck in Magnum, P.I.
 A De Tomaso Pantera which belonged to Elvis Presley
 One of the DeLorean time machines from Back to the Future
 Luke Skywalker's landspeeder from Star Wars
 The Plymouth XNR built by Gotham Garage on Car Masters: Rust to Riches
 The Corwin Getaway, a compact mid-engined car designed by photographer Cliff Hall that debuted at the 1970 LA Auto Show.

Finances
The museum received a $100-million gift from Margie Petersen and the Margie & Robert E. Petersen Foundation in April 2011, which includes cash and the property the museum was leasing, as well as many of the vehicles belonging to the Petersens.

Murder of Notorious B.I.G. 
On March 8, 1997, the Petersen Automotive Museum hosted a Soul Train Awards afterparty, set by Vibe Magazine and Quest Records. Guests included Faith Evans, Timbaland, The Wayans Brothers, Chris Tucker, various NBA Stars, The Notorious B.I.G. and Puff Daddy.

At about midnight, the Fire Department shut down the party at the Museum and everyone began to leave. Biggie and Puff Daddy left in their 2 GMC Suburbans to attend another party in Beverly Hills. At 12:47 A.M., Biggie's suburban stopped at a red light on the corner of S. Fairfax Avenue and Wilshire Blvd. At the same time, a dark-colored Chevy Impala pulled up and drew a 9mm Blue Steel pistol and shot Biggie 4 times. The killer sped away on East Wilshire while Biggie's entourage rushed in to the nearby Cedars-Sinai Medical Center, but Biggie was pronounced dead at 1:15 A.M. He was 24 years old.

In popular culture

Ohrbach's department store is featured in a lengthy sequence in the 1988 film Miracle Mile.

The museum is destroyed by a lava flow in the 1997 film Volcano.

In a scene from Who Killed the Electric Car?, a previous General Motors EV1 owner visits their car in the museum.

On March 10, 2019,  Adam Carolla held his 10th Anniversary Celebration for his podcast The Adam Carolla Show at the museum.

References

External links

 
 1897 Anthony Electric Runabout

Museums in Los Angeles
Automobile museums in California
Mid-Wilshire, Los Angeles
Wilshire Boulevard
Welton Becket buildings
Museums established in 1994
1994 establishments in California